Michael Aguilar may refer to:
 Double-O (born Michael Aguilar), American producer and one half of the hip-hop group Kidz in the Hall
 Michael J. Aguilar (born 1950), retired United States Marine Corps brigadier general and the Federal Security Director of the San Diego International Airport
 Michael Quintero (born Michael Quintero Aguilar in 1980), Colombian professional tennis player
 Michael Aguilar (athlete) (born 1979), Belizean athlete who shares a national record in the 4x100 meter relay